Alice W. Bridges (July 19, 1916 – May 5, 2011), also known by her married name Alice Roche, was an American competition swimmer, who at age 20, represented the United States at the 1936 Summer Olympics in Berlin, Germany.

Biography
 Bridges grew up in Uxbridge, Massachusetts. She and her twin sister learned to swim in a pond in Uxbridge; Alice then later trained at the Olympic pool in nearby Whitinsville, Massachusetts.

At the age of twenty, she was chosen to represent the United States at the 1936 Summer Olympics in Berlin, Germany. When the sudden chance arose for her to participate, residents of her hometown raised funds to pay for her travel to Berlin, which she otherwise could not have afforded.

Immediately following her Olympic meet, it appeared that Bridges, who originally was a back-up contestant, had actually won her event. Several hours later, however, the judges reversed their decision, and awarded the gold and silver medals to two women from the Netherlands, leaving the bronze for Bridges.

Alice Bridges Bridge

In 2008, the State of Massachusetts, and local officials named the downtown Mumford River bridge in Uxbridge, in Bridges' honor, in her 92nd year.  Until her death, she resided in Carlisle, Pennsylvania.

See also
 List of Olympic medalists in swimming (women)

References

External links
 
 Alice Bridges' obituary

1916 births
2011 deaths
American female backstroke swimmers
Olympic bronze medalists for the United States in swimming
Swimmers at the 1936 Summer Olympics
People from Carlisle, Pennsylvania
People from Uxbridge, Massachusetts
Medalists at the 1936 Summer Olympics
Sportspeople from Worcester County, Massachusetts
21st-century American women